The Men's Handball Tournament at the 1991 Pan American Games was held from August 5 to August 12, 1991 in Havana, Cuba. The women did not compete at this edition.

Men's tournament

Final ranking

Awards

References
Results
sports123

H
P
1991
Handball competitions in Cuba